West Wycombe Park contains a number garden temples, pavilions and follies; many of these are listed for their architectural or historical significance:

 Boathouse
 Britannia Pillar
 Cascade (Grade II)
 Gothic Alcove
 Kittys Lodge
 North Lodge (Grade II*)
 Park Farm (private residence)
 Round Lodge
 Round Temple
 Sawmill House (private residence)
 Small Temple (Grade II*)
 'St Crispins' (chapel)
 Temple of Apollo (Grade II*)
 Temple of Bacchus (Grade II*)
 Temple of Daphne (Grade II*)
 Temple of Diana
 Temple of Flora (Grade II*)
 Temple of Music (Grade II*)
 Temple of Venus
 Temple of the Winds (building) (Grade II*)
 Venus's Parlour

References

Buildings and structures in Buckinghamshire
Folly buildings in England